Aya Rachel Cash is an American actress. She is best known for starring as Gretchen Cutler in the FX/FXX dark comedy series You're the Worst (2014–2019), as Stormfront in the Amazon Prime Video superhero drama series The Boys (2020–2022), and most recently as Cheryl Peterson in the Fox sitcom Welcome to Flatch. She was nominated for the Critics' Choice Television Award for Best Actress in a Comedy Series and the TCA Award for Individual Achievement in Comedy for You're the Worst. Cash also appeared in numerous films, including The Oranges (2011), Sleepwalk with Me (2012), Begin Again (2013), The Wolf of Wall Street (2013), Mary Goes Round (2017), Game Over, Man! (2018), and Scare Me (2020).

Early life
Cash was born in San Francisco, California, to poet and novelist Kim Addonizio and Buddhist teacher Eugene Cash. On her mother's side, she is the granddaughter of tennis champion Pauline Betz and sports writer Bob Addie.  Her father's family is Jewish, while her mother is Catholic. Cash has described herself as Jewish, and explained that their surname "was originally something like 'CH-irsch'."

Cash is an alumna of the San Francisco School of the Arts. She graduated from the University of Minnesota in 2004 with a Bachelor of Fine Arts in Acting, in partnership with the Guthrie Theater Actor Training Program. She then moved to New York City, where she began her acting career. For years, she struggled financially and worked as a full-time waitress to make ends meet.

Career

Television
Cash's television appearances include Brotherhood, Law & Order, Law & Order: Special Victims Unit, Law and Order: Criminal Intent, Mercy, and The Newsroom. Cash was also a series regular in the 2011 Fox comedy Traffic Light, which ran for one season. From 2014 to 2019, she starred in the FX Network series You're the Worst as Gretchen Cutler. She received critical acclaim for her performance, with the website The A.V. Club calling her acting in the second season "the best TV performance of 2015".

In 2019, she was cast as Stormfront in the second season of the Prime Video superhero dark comedy-drama series The Boys. The second season premiered in September 2020.

In 2020, Cash was cast as local newspaper reporter Cheryl Peterson in a pilot for a Fox sitcom titled This Country. The title was later changed to Welcome to Flatch, which premiered in 2022.

Film
Cash's film credits include The Oranges, Winter of Frozen Dreams, Off Jackson Avenue, Begin Again, The Bits In Between, Game Over, Man!, and The Happy House. She had a small role as Janet, Jordan Belfort's assistant in The Wolf of Wall Street.

Theatre
Additionally, Cash has appeared on Off-Broadway. In 2014, she starred in the world premiere of Zoe Kazan's play Trudy And Max In Love.

Personal life
Cash met writer and producer Josh Alexander when she was his waitress. They dated for seven years before marrying in 2012. They reside together in New York City.

Cash both identifies as Jewish and was raised Jewish, but no longer practices the religion, stating, "my mother is Catholic, my father is Jewish, but I was raised Jewish in a very not strict temple [...] then I chose, after my Bat Mitzvah, not to continue." Although she also mentioned that she has participated in Jewish holidays over the years, but not in many of them in recent years.

Cash said that she has a hawk tattooed on her back because she was told that Aya means "hawk" in Hebrew. However, when she visited Israel she was told that "Aya" is an archaic word for "hawk", though it is, in fact, the Modern Hebrew word for "honey buzzard", a different bird of prey.

Cash is a celebrity ambassador for INARA, an NGO that helps war-wounded refugee children from Syria get medical help.

Filmography

Film

Television

Theatre

|2023
|"The Best We Could (A Family Tragedy)"
|Ella
|NY City Center Stage
|-

Awards and nominations

References

External links

 

Living people
Actresses from San Francisco
American film actresses
American television actresses
Jewish American actresses
University of Minnesota College of Liberal Arts alumni
21st-century American actresses
21st-century American Jews
Year of birth missing (living people)